Sheila Greenwald (born May 26, 1934) is an American writer and illustrator of books for children and young adults. She is known best for Rosy Cole’s Great American Guilt Club (1985) and other Rosy Cole books, and  has won awards including the Parents' Choice Award, and the Santa Monica Library's Green Prize for sustainable literature.

Personal life 

Greenwald was born (May 26, 1934) in New York City to parents, Julius and Florence (née Friedman) Greenwald and grew up in the Upper West Side of Manhattan. She graduated from the High School of Music & Art as an art major and from Sarah Lawrence College as a literature major.
Greenwald is married to George E. Green, a cardiac surgeon, and has two children, Ben and Sam.

Career
Greenwald is a writer and illustrator of children's picture books, books for young readers, young adult books, and magazine articles.  She has written and illustrated 30 books of her own which received positive reviews, as well as illustrating for magazines.  She began her career as an illustrator in 1956 and her writing career in 1962 with, A Metropolitan Love Story. In 1971, with the encouragement of her editor, she began writing books that she had once only illustrated. In an article written by Greenwald for Publishers Weekly in 2018, she wrote, "The Rosy Cole books", edited by Melanie Kroupa, "not only gave me the opportunity to create humor and character by juxtaposing text with illustrations, but allowed me to vent opinions on competition, sexual precocity, materialism, conformity to peer pressure, and more".

Greenwald has created illustrations for over seventy books for both adults and children written by others, among them the classic, The Pink Motel, by  Carol Ryrie Brink. In the July, 1966 issue of Harper's Magazine she wrote, My Life Story, as well as illustrating additional articles, which were not her own.  All of her published work has been written and illustrated by Greenwald with the exception of two, Bossy Flossie, books which were illustrated by Pierre Collet-Derby.

Her work for children, both text and illustration has been donated to the De Grummond Children’s Literature Collection at the McCain Library and Archives at The University of Southern Mississippi.  Greenwald wrote, A Day With the Knights: A Real Imaginary Adventure, for the Metropolitan Museum of Art and has contributed to Cricket Magazine, The New York Times, Gourmet Magazine, and The Reporter Magazine.

Books
 
 1960 - A Metropolitan Love Story
 1971 - Willie Bryant and The Flying Otis 
 1972 - The Hot Day 
 1972 - Amanda Snap 
 1972 - Mat Pit And The Tunnel Tenants 
 1974 - The Secret Museum
 1977 - The Secret In Miranda’s Closet 
 1977 - The Mariah Delany Lending Library Disaster 
 1978 - The Atrocious Two 
 1978 - All the Way To Wits End 
 1980 - It All Began With Jane Eyre  
 1981 - Give Us A Great Big Smile Rosy Cole  An ALA notable book
 1982 - Blissful Joy And The SAT’s Atlantic Monthly Press 
 1983 - Will the Real Gertrude Hollings Please Stand Up 
 1984 - Valentine Rosy Atlantic Monthly Press 
 1985 - Rosy Cole’s Great American Guilt Club  Parent's Choice Selection 1985 
 1987 - Alvin Webster’s Sure Fire Plan For Success And How It Failed
 1988 - Write On Rosy 
 1989 - Rosy’s Romance 
 1990 - Mariah Delany’s Author Of the Month Club 
 1991 - Here's Hermione
 1992 - Rosy Cole Discovers America 
 1993 - My Fabulous New Life 
 1994 - Rosy Cole, She Walks In Beauty 
 1997 - Rosy Cole, She Grows and Graduates - 
 2000 - Stucksville
 2003 - Rosy Cole’s Worst Ever Best Yet Tour Of New York City 
 2006 - Rosy Cole’s Memoir Explosion, A Heartbreaking Story about Losing Friends, Annoying Family, and Ruining Romance  
 2010 - Watch Out World Rosy Cole Is Going Green 
 2017 - Bossy Flossie Biz Whiz
 2017 - Bossy Flossie, The Secret To Success # 2

Awards
 1981 - American Library Association - Notable Children's Book - Give Us a Great Big Smile, Rosy Cole
 1983 - Junior Library Guild Selection - Will the Real Gertrude Hollings Please Stand Up?
 1985 - Parents' Choice Award - Rosy Cole's Great American Guilt Club
 1987 - New York Public Library "One of 100 Best Books for Children" - Alvin Webster's Surefire Plan for Success
 1989 - Junior Library Guild Selection - Rosy's Romance
 1990 - Junior Library Guild Selection - Mariah Delany's Author-of-the-Month Club
 1997 - Junior Library Guild Selection - Rosy Cole: She Grows and Graduates 
 2003 - Junior Library Guild Selection - Rosy Cole's Worst Ever Best Yet Tour of New York City
 2006 - Junior Library Guild Selection - Rosy Cole's Memoir Explosion, a Heartbreaking Story About Losing Friends, Annoying Family, and Ruining Romance
 2007 - Bank Street College of Education - "One of the Ten Best Children's Books of the Year" - Rosy Cole's Memoir Explosion, a Heartbreaking Story About Losing Friends, Annoying Family, and Ruining Romance 
 2011 - The Santa Monica Library Green Prize For Sustainable Literature - Watch out World, Rosy Cole is Going Green (re-released by National Geographic Learning, August 2015)

References

External links 

 

1934 births
20th-century American women writers
21st-century American women writers
American women children's writers
American children's book illustrators
American women illustrators
Writers who illustrated their own writing
American children's writers
American young adult novelists
Living people